The 22nd National Television Awards were held at The O2 Arena on 25 January 2017. The awards were hosted by Dermot O'Leary and Scarlett Moffatt.

This was the last time that the National Television Awards would air on a Wednesday.

Performances
 Tom Jones
 James Arthur

Awards

References

External links
The National Television Awards official website
The O2 official website

National Television Awards
N
2017 in British television
N
N
National Television Awards